Marketing Festival is one of the main conferences on digital marketing in Central Europe, organized annually since 2013 by Jindřich Fáborský with his team and the Marketing Festival company.

The designation "festival" refers to the unconventional format of the conference, which combines lectures with an accompanying program of evening concerts and parties to strengthen networking among speakers and participants.

Many of digital marketers have lectured at the conference including: Marty Neumeier, Avinash Kaushik, Larry Kim, Peter Meyers, Neil Patel, Lukasz Zelezny and Cyrus Shepard.

The first three Marketing Festivals (2013-2015) were held in Brno, the fourth in 2016 in Ostrava and the fifth in 2017 was scheduled to take place in Prague. Marketing Festival was nominated twice for the Marketing Inspiration award of Křišťálová Lupa (2014, 2015). Since May 2016, Marketing Festival has been registered as a European trademark.

References

Business conferences
Annual events in the Czech Republic